Wodey-Suchard is a pâtisserie and confectionery in the pedestrian zone of Neuchâtel, Switzerland. Founded in 1825 by Philippe Suchard, it is one of the oldest in Switzerland and the oldest still operating in Neuchâtel.

References

External links

Pâtisserie
Companies based in Neuchâtel